Enrico Bianchini (30 July 1903 – 24 October 1971) was an Italian civil engineer. His work was part of the architecture event in the art competition at the 1936 Summer Olympics.

References

1903 births
1971 deaths
20th-century Italian architects
20th-century Italian engineers
Italian civil engineers
Olympic competitors in art competitions
Architects from Pavia
People from Robbio